Aleksandr Sergeyevich Kabanov (14 June 1948 – 30 June 2020) was a Soviet and Russian water polo player and head coach of the Russian water polo team. He is one of a few sportspeople who won Olympic medals in water polo as players and head coaches.

Kabanov died on 30 June 2020, aged 72.

Achievements
Gold in the 1972 Munich Olympics
Gold in the Water Polo World Championship in Cali 1975
Gold in the 1980 Moscow Olympics
Gold in the 1981 FINA Men's Water Polo World Cup
Silver in the European water polo championship Split 1981
Gold in the 1982 FINA Men's World Water Polo Championship
Gold in the 1983 FINA Men's Water Polo World Cup

In 1972 Kabanov was awarded the title of Honoured Master of Sport of the USSR. He graduated from Armenian State Institute of Physical Culture and Sport in 1984.

Books

See also
 Russia men's Olympic water polo team records and statistics
 Soviet Union men's Olympic water polo team records and statistics
 List of Olympic champions in men's water polo
 List of Olympic medalists in water polo (men)
 List of world champions in men's water polo
 List of World Aquatics Championships medalists in water polo
 List of members of the International Swimming Hall of Fame

References

External links
 

1948 births
2020 deaths
Sportspeople from Moscow
Russian male water polo players
Soviet male water polo players
Olympic water polo players of the Soviet Union
Water polo players at the 1972 Summer Olympics
Water polo players at the 1976 Summer Olympics
Water polo players at the 1980 Summer Olympics
Medalists at the 1972 Summer Olympics
Medalists at the 1980 Summer Olympics
Olympic gold medalists for the Soviet Union
Olympic medalists in water polo
Russian water polo coaches
Russia men's national water polo team coaches
Water polo coaches at the 1996 Summer Olympics
Water polo coaches at the 2000 Summer Olympics
Water polo coaches at the 2004 Summer Olympics
Russia women's national water polo team coaches
Water polo coaches at the 2012 Summer Olympics
Universiade medalists in water polo
Universiade gold medalists for the Soviet Union
Armenian State Institute of Physical Culture and Sport alumni